Nicholas "Nick" McKay is an Australian actor who has appeared in a recurring role on the television series Farscape.  In addition, he voiced Nev, a bull elephant seal in the acclaimed 2006 animated film, Happy Feet.  He is the voice actor for The X Factor (Australia) and he was the original narrator of MasterChef Australia from 2009 until 2012.

He was educated at The King's School, Parramatta.

He was the voice-over for Network 10 multi-channel One HD, between 2009 & 2012.

He is currently voice-over for the Seven News division of the Seven Network and associated promos.

References

External links
Website

Living people
Australian male actors
Year of birth missing (living people)